Tarhan-e Gharbi Rural District is a rural district (dehestan) in Tarhan District, Kuhdasht County, Lorestan Province, Iran. At the 2006 census, its population was 8,847, in 1,703 families.  The rural district has 22 villages.

References 

Rural Districts of Lorestan Province
Kuhdasht County